Ventsislav Aydarski (born 17 February 1991 in Sandanski) is a former Bulgarian swimmer. At the 2012 Summer Olympics, he competed in the Men's 1500 metre freestyle, finishing in 28th place overall in the heats, failing to qualify for the final.  At the 2016 Summer Olympics, he raced in the 10 km open water marathon event, finishing in 15th place.

Aydarski began swimming at the age of seven, and retired in 2018.

References

External links
 

1991 births
Living people
Bulgarian male swimmers
Male long-distance swimmers
Bulgarian male freestyle swimmers
Olympic swimmers of Bulgaria
Swimmers at the 2012 Summer Olympics
Swimmers at the 2016 Summer Olympics
People from Sandanski
Sportspeople from Blagoevgrad Province
20th-century Bulgarian people
21st-century Bulgarian people